Allan Nielsen (born June 26, 1976) is a Danish former professional football midfielder.

Nielsen moved in 2007 from Køge BK to the Danish Superliga side Odense Boldklub. As he only played four matches for them in six months, he moved to the promoted team, Lyngby BK. In the Autumn of 2007 he played 9 matches for Lyngby, but on January 2, 2008, Nielsen first cancelled his contract with Lyngby, and later the same day chose to end his career.

References

1976 births
Living people
Danish men's footballers
Danish Superliga players
Hvidovre IF players
Køge Boldklub players
Odense Boldklub players
Lyngby Boldklub players

Association football midfielders